Mem Sahib is a 1956 Bollywood drama film directed and produced by R.C. Talwar starring Meena Kumari, Kishore Kumar and Shammi Kapoor in lead roles.

Plot 
Bombay-based Meena (Meena Kumari) lives a wealthy lifestyle along with her Chacha and Chachi in a mansion. When asked to marry, she places an advertisement in the local newspaper, and after interviewing many males, chooses Manohar (Shammi Kapoor)  to be her future husband. She shares this news as well as introduces him to her family - who disapprove and remind her that her late father had selected a groom named Sunder even before she was born. She scoffs at this and announces that she will marry Manohar soon. Then Sunder (Kishore Kumar), who was living at an ashram for Brahmacharis, shows up at her home - complete in  traditional ashram clothing and is ready to marry her. When facing rejection, he decides to change his lifestyle and be like Manohar - and does so - albeit with hilarious results. He is pleased when he notices a change in her and takes her home to introduce her to his mother - little knowing that the change is only superficial - and she an hidden agenda.

Cast 
Meena Kumari as Meena
Kishore Kumar as Sunder
Shammi Kapoor as Manohar
Kumkum as Kamini
Mehmood as Hardeep Kumar
Om Prakash as Brothel Patron
Randhir as Communist
Shivraj as Sunder's Guru
Pratima Devi as Sunder's Mother

Music 
Madan Mohan was the music director while lyricist Rajinder Krishan wrote songs of this film.

References

External links 

Films scored by Madan Mohan
1950s Hindi-language films
Indian drama films
1956 drama films
Indian black-and-white films